The PRU-70/P22P-18 (V) is an Armored Survival Vest (ASV) that is intended for aircrews. It was designed by Naval Air Systems Command Human Systems Division. The vests are manufactured by Peckham Vocational Industries in Michigan and are used by Navy and Marine aircrew in Iraq and Afghanistan.

The PRU-70 merges both the aircrew survival vest and the latest in body armor. The new system was developed to fit the various body types and sizes in the current U.S. aircrew population. The PRU-70 is also designed to reduce the bulk, weight and heat stressors commonly encountered by helicopter aircrews flying combat missions. The PRU-70 uses Halo-Tech fire retardant. The PRU-70 is produced in Coyote Brown camouflage color, which blends into the environment of 70 percent of the world's land masses.

The PRU-70 replaces three different items of aircrew clothing: the standard AIRSAVE Survival Vest, the separate body armor system that is worn beneath the AIRSAVE survival vest, and the current PRU-60B. According to the manufacturer, this results in reduced cost and configuration management for both forces in combat and in logistic terms, because of its ability to be worn as a stand-alone survival vest by being configured with or without life preservers (as authorized) and by adding or deleting body armor as needed.

The PRU-70 is being replaced by the Aircrew Endurance Vest.

See also
Flak Jacket
Improved Outer Tactical Vest (IOTV)
Modular Tactical Vest (MTV)
Personnel Armor System for Ground Troops (PASGT)
Interceptor body armor

References

 http://www.defensetech.org/archives/004598.html
 https://web.archive.org/web/20081223220950/http://pao.navair.navy.mil/press_releases/index.cfm?fuseaction=press_release_view&press_release_id=4044&site_id=29

Body armor
Ballistic vests
Military equipment of the United States
Military equipment introduced in the 2000s